Interstate 85 (I-85) in the US state of South Carolina runs northeast–southwest through Upstate South Carolina. Connecting regionally with Atlanta, Georgia, and Charlotte, North Carolina, it became the first Interstate Highway in South Carolina to have its originally planned mileage completed.

Route description

Georgia state line to Greenville
I-85 enters South Carolina along the Vandiver Bridge from Georgia, crossing over Tugaloo River/Lake Hartwell. It is immediately followed by exit 1, where the welcome center and the start of South Carolina Highway 11 (SC 11; Cherokee Foothills Scenic Highway) are located. For the next , I-85 continues along the north shores of Lake Hartwell, crossing over some parts of it. At the US Highway 76 (US 76)/SC 28 interchange (exit 19), the highway widens to six lanes. Continuing northeast, US 29 joins I-85 (exit 34), near Piedmont, as they run concurrently until after they cross the Saluda River.

Greenville to Spartanburg

I-85 bypasses Greenville to the south, but provides a link into the city via spur routes I-185 and I-385. US 29 splits from I-85 and joins I-185 toward downtown Greenville.

Two key upstate businesses can be seen from this portion of the Interstate. One is Michelin's North American headquarters and the other is the BMW plant, located in Greer. I-85 also passes Greenville–Spartanburg International Airport (exit 57), which serves the Greenville–Spartanburg–Anderson metropolitan area.

Spartanburg to North Carolina state line
Along the bypass routing, I-85 connects with I-26 (exit 70) and indirectly connects with I-585, via US 176 (exit 72).

At milemarker 79, I-85 narrows back down to four-lanes. The remaining  is the oldest section, which features a few low height bridges such as a  railroad bridge originally used by the Clinchfield Railroad (now the CSX Transportation Blue Ridge Subdivision) east of exit 80, and intriguing exit/entrance ramps. At milemarker 91 in Gaffney, travelers will not be able to miss the Peachoid, a large water tower with its top shaped like a peach, representing one of the state's most important crops. At milemarker 95, an old plantation cemetery is located on a knoll in the median of I-85; more visible to see on southbound lanes. A  decrepit railroad bridge can be found in the vicinity of Blacksburg between exits 100 and 102. At milemarker 103 is the southbound welcome center. I-85 enters North Carolina  later.

Services

The South Carolina Department of Transportation (SCDOT) operates and maintains two welcome centers and five rest areas along I-85. Welcome centers, which have a travel information facility on site, are located at the collector–distributor road for exit 1 (northbound), and around milemarker 103 (southbound); rest areas are located at milemarkers 17 (northbound) and 24 (southbound). Common at all locations are public restrooms, public telephones, vending machines, picnic area, and barbecue grills.

The South Carolina Department of Public Safety (SCDPS) and State Transport Police (STP) operate and maintain one truck inspection/weigh station, located northbound at milemarker 9 in Fair Play. The location utilizes weigh-in-motion that does not require commercial motor vehicles to leave the freeway to be weighed.

History

Established in 1959, I-85 originally ran along the newly widened four-lane section of US 29, from Fort Prince Boulevard (SC 129, exit 68) to the North Carolina state line. Construction also started around that time extending I-85 from Fort Prince Boulevard to I-185, south of Greenville. In 1961, construction started on another section, from Georgia state line to US 29, near Piedmont. In 1962, US 29 was removed from the entire existing section of I-85 at that time.

By 1964, I-85 was extended south from Fort Prince Boulevard to I-185/US 29. Also, smaller sections were open: from the Georgia state line to Road 23 (exit 4) and from SC 24/SC 243 (exit 11) to US 178 (exit 21). By 1967, I-85 was completed in the state. It was South Carolina's first Interstate Highway fully completed.

In 1995, I-85 was moved onto a new six-lane freeway north of its existing route near Spartanburg, from milemarkers 69–77. The old alignment became I-85 Bus freeway loop. In 1998, exit 46B was added, connecting to Pleasantburg Drive (SC 291).

Being a four-lane freeway since inception, the first widening to six lanes (excluding the new freeway near Spartanburg) was completed in 1998, from US 276 to I-385. By end of 2003, I-85 was widened to six lanes from US 76/SC 28 (exit 19) north to US 221 (exit 78).

Exit list

Related routes
I-85 in South Carolina has three auxiliary routes and one business route. I-185 enters  Greenville from the southwest and runs between I-85 and I-385 as a toll road. I-385 enters Greenville from the east and connects I-85 with I-26 toward Columbia. I-585 enters Spartanburg from the northwest between I-85 and US 221 and becomes North Pine Street; it does not connect with I-85 . I-85 Business in Spartanburg is freeway grade throughout its length.

See also

References

External links

85
 South Carolina
Transportation in Oconee County, South Carolina
Transportation in Anderson County, South Carolina
Transportation in Greenville County, South Carolina
Transportation in Spartanburg County, South Carolina
Transportation in Cherokee County, South Carolina